Wihan Johannes Lubbe (born 22 November 1992) is a South African cricketer. He made his international debut for the South Africa cricket team in April 2021.

Career
He was included in the North West cricket team squad for the 2015 Africa T20 Cup. In August 2017, he was named in Nelson Mandela Bay Stars' squad for the first season of the T20 Global League. However, in October 2017, Cricket South Africa initially postponed the tournament until November 2018, with it being cancelled soon after.

In June 2018, he was named in the squad for the Highveld Lions team for the 2018–19 season. In September 2018, he was named in North West's squad for the 2018 Africa T20 Cup. On 15 September 2018, he scored his first T20 century, against Limpopo, in Group D of the tournament. He only took 33 balls to reach 100 runs, making it the third fastest T20 century ever. Lubbe was the leading run-scorer for North West in the tournament, with 173 runs in five matches.

In September 2019, he was named in the squad for the Durban Heat team for the 2019 Mzansi Super League tournament. Later the same month, he was named as the captain of North West's squad for the 2019–20 CSA Provincial T20 Cup. In January 2020, in the 2019–20 CSA 4-Day Franchise Series, he took his maiden five-wicket haul in first-class cricket.

In March 2021, Lubbe was named in South Africa's Twenty20 International (T20I) squad for their series against Pakistan. He made his T20I debut for South Africa, against Pakistan, on 10 April 2021. Later the same month, he was named in Eastern Province's squad, ahead of the 2021–22 cricket season in South Africa.

References

External links
 

1992 births
Living people
Cricketers from Pretoria
South African cricketers
South Africa Twenty20 International cricketers
North West cricketers
Lions cricketers
Jozi Stars cricketers
Nelson Mandela Bay Giants cricketers
Durban Heat cricketers
Warriors cricketers
Eastern Province cricketers